Pachydota punctata is a moth of the family Erebidae. It was described by Walter Rothschild in 1909. It is found in French Guiana, Brazil, Bolivia, Suriname, Venezuela and Ecuador.

References

Phaegopterina
Moths described in 1909